Bălănești Hill is the highest geographical point in Moldova, with an altitude of 430 m (429 m according to some sources). It is located in Bălănești and belongs to the Cornești Hills.

Gallery

See also
 Extreme points of Moldova

References

External links
 IndexMundi map

Extreme points of Moldova
Highest points of countries
Hills of Moldova